The seventh season of Weeds premiered on June 27, 2011, on the television cable network Showtime, and consisted of 13 episodes. As the season picks up, Nancy has spent three years in prison and now lives in a strictly monitored halfway house in New York City, where the family meet after they have spent three years in Denmark.

Plot 
Three years after Nancy's arrest, Nancy is released from jail and is transferred to a New York City halfway house; Esteban had died in prison; the Botwins are residing in Copenhagen, and they return to New York City to visit Nancy. Jill, who has been raising Stevie to believe Nancy is his aunt, wants custody of Stevie. With the help of Jill's husband, Nancy reunites with Stevie at a planetarium, but he seems to have only a mild attachment to her. Doug reunites with an old college friend, who gets him hired at a venture capital firm. Shane begins taking criminal justice classes and befriends a NYPD detective, Det. Mitch Ouellette.

In California, Nancy attempts to obtain pot from Heylia, who is cultivating a massive field of Conrad's MILF weed; Dean has moved in with Heylia to assist her with legal advice. Heylia provides Nancy with MILF weed, in exchange for Silas' labor to harvest the current crop. Andy pitches an idea for a motorized bike; Shane provides Andy with financial backing to open the business and use it as a cover for Nancy's operation. Nancy, meanwhile, begins an affair with Demetri, the pot-dealing brother of Zoya, her cellmate in prison. Zoya is released from jail and discovers the affair.

Meanwhile, the SEC begins an investigation on Doug's firm for hiding funds. In exchange for an early release from the halfway house, Nancy becomes an informant for the SEC. Wearing a wire, she goes on a "date" with Chuck, the company's CEO; Zoya interrupts and spills information about Nancy's drug business, spurring Nancy to muffle her mic. Wanting to get rid of Zoya, Nancy informs Chuck about her wire, and he flees; Nancy then sets fire to his home in an attempt to frame Zoya for arson. Fearing new criminal charges, Zoya flees to Vermont. The SEC agents threaten to throw Nancy back in jail, but Doug blackmails them into letting Nancy go. With Zoya out of the picture, Nancy begins her drug business, using Doug's corporate position to give herself leverage against their main competition, Pouncy House Party Rentals.

Shane hands Nancy a police report on Pouncy House; preoccupied, she leaves the file on the counter. Silas has sex with Emma, Pouncy House's manager, though he does not know of her true occupation. Emma steals valuable information from Silas and raids Andy's office. Silas and Emma eventually agree to a merger, but Nancy informs Ouellette about Emma's involvement with Pouncy House; Ouellette leads a police raid. Upon realizing that Nancy reported Pouncy House to eliminate their competition, Ouellette is infuriated, as the Botwins used the NYPD as their drug muscle. Following the raid, Silas furiously ends his partnership with Nancy, and he attempts to negotiate with Demetri to begin his own business.

After learning that Nancy and Silas are on opposing sides, Demetri—who is trying to sabotage Silas—convinces his gang to intercept Silas' next MILF delivery; Heylia and Dean are robbed at gunpoint by Demetri's men. Nancy learns of the robbery and tells Demetri to return the shipment. Infuriated, Silas plots revenge against Nancy, informing Jill about Nancy's drug business that she can use against Nancy in court. As Jill arrives in New York, Nancy receives a call from the judge and discovers she will most likely get custody of Stevie.

Jill threatens to report Nancy if she doesn't sign over custody of Stevie; Nancy refuses. When Demetri is arrested in an unrelated crime, Nancy collects the stolen shipment from Demetri's apartment. After a conversation with Andy, Silas regrets calling Jill, as he had taken the rivalry between him and Nancy too far. Jill is still insistent that Nancy sign over custody, but Andy resolves the issue by getting everyone to agree to live together in Connecticut. Several months later, the new "Botwin, Price-Gray" estate is launched. Shane is training to be a police officer with the NYPD, but he keeps this a secret from Nancy. During an outdoor family dinner, Nancy is shot in the head by an unknown person.

Cast

Main cast 
Mary-Louise Parker as Nancy Botwin
Hunter Parrish as Silas Botwin
Alexander Gould as Shane Botwin
Justin Kirk as Andy Botwin
Kevin Nealon as Doug Wilson

Special guest stars 
Jennifer Jason Leigh as Jill Price-Grey (5 episodes)
Tonye Patano as Heylia James (4 episodes)
Martin Short as Steward Havens (3 episodes)
Aidan Quinn as Foster "Chuck" Klein (4 episodes)
Pablo Schreiber as Demetri Ravitch (7 episodes)
Michelle Trachtenberg as Emma Karlin (5 episodes)

Former cast members 
Tonye Patano and Andy Milder return as recurring characters, as Heylia James and Dean Hodes respectively.

Recurring cast 

Olga Sosnovska as Zoya Ravitch
Andy Milder as Dean Hodes
Bruce Nozick as Whit Tillerman
Kat Foster as Kiku
Lindsay Sloane as Maxeen
David Clennon as Charles
Michael Harney as Mitch Ouellette
Ethan and Gavin Kent as Stevie Ray Botwin
Amanda Pace as Taylor Grey
Rachel Pace as Shayla Grey
Tammy Caplan as Spoons
Karen Strassman as Jolene Waite
Gary Anthony Williams as Ed Watson
Christian Wennberg as Gunder
Miriam F. Glover as Nancy's Roommate
Charlotte Bjornbak as Renata
Debra Mooney as Shelby Keene
Roy Abramsohn as Rick Levine
Mel Fair as Scott
Seth Isler as Melnick
John Fleck as Agent Lipschitz
Alex Schemmer as Denny
Eric Nenninger as Dimtri's Thug #1
Ian Reed Kesler as Dimtri's Thug #2
Roy Werner as Greg Hillegas
Jon Collin Barclay as Barton Bailey
Melvin Abston as Tyson Betz
Blaise Embry as Alex
Brendan Ford as Colm Mulcahey
David Clennon as Charles
Michael Emanuel as Stability House Front Desk
Tom Simmons as Dr. Palmer
Peter Chen as Mr. Yu

Episodes

References

External links 
 
 

 
2011 American television seasons